The Kongō Maru-class armed merchant cruiser was a class of two armed merchant cruisers of the Imperial Japanese Navy.

Background
The Kongō Maru-class vessels  and Kiyosumi Maru were built by IHI Corporation at Kawasaki shipyard in Kobe as combined cargo-passenger ships. They were converted to "auxiliary cruiser" role in September–December 1941 (and therefore armed).

References

 

Auxiliary cruisers of the Imperial Japanese Navy